Tappeh Goji (also Romanized as Tappeh Gojī, Tappeh Kojī, Tappeh-ye Gorg, Tappeh Gachī, and Tepe Gurg) is a village in Beyranvand-e Shomali Rural District, Bayravand District, Khorramabad County, Lorestan Province, Iran. At the 2006 census, its population was 821, in 171 families.

References 

Towns and villages in Khorramabad County